Allocasuarina lehmanniana, commonly known as dune sheoak, is a shrub in the family Casuarinaceae.  Endemic to Western Australia, it is widespread along on the coast from the Murchison River south to Israelite Bay.

Dune sheoak grows as an upright shrub from three to five metres tall (10–16 ft).  As with other Allocasuarina species, its foliage consists of slender green branchlets informally referred to as "needles" but more correctly termed cladodes.  The cladodes are segmented, and the true leaves are tiny teeth encircling each joint.  Most specimens bear only male or female flowers, but some specimens will bear both.  Male trees have small brown flower spikes at the end of branchlets.  Female trees bear small flowers on short branchlets of their own.  Fertilised flowers develop egg-shaped cones from 1½ to 3 centimetres (0.6–1.2 in) in diameter.

Dune Sheoak was first collected in 1840 by Johann Priess.  The specific name lehmanniana honours the botanist Johann Lehmann.

There are two subspecies: Allocasuarina lehmanniana subsp. ecarinata and Allocasuarina lehmanniana subsp. lehmanniana.

References

External links
  Occurrence data for Allocasuarina lehmanniana from The Australasian Virtual Herbarium

lehmanniana
Rosids of Western Australia
Fagales of Australia